Chaistla Butte is a  elevation summit located south of Monument Valley, in Navajo County of northeast Arizona. It is one of the eroded volcanic plugs, or diatremes, of the Navajo Volcanic Field, which is a volcanic field that includes intrusions and flows of minette and other unusual igneous rocks which formed around 30 million years ago during the Oligocene. Its neighbors include Agathla Peak and Owl Rock,  to the north-northwest. Precipitation runoff from this feature drains into the Laguña Creek drainage basin. The chaistla name, which means "beaver pocket" or "beaver corner" in the Navajo language, was officially adopted in 1915 by the U.S. Board on Geographic Names. Navajo teachings have its name meaning "to support the sky's underside", such that if this butte were to fall, the world would end. It is also known as Turkey Butte.

Climate
Spring and fall are the most favorable seasons to visit Chaistla Butte. According to the Köppen climate classification system, it is located in a semi-arid climate zone with cold winters and hot summers. Summers average 54 days above  annually, and highs rarely exceed . Summer nights are comfortably cool, and temperatures drop quickly after sunset. Winters are cold, but daytime highs are usually above freezing. Winter temperatures below  are uncommon, though possible.

Gallery

See also
 Four Corners
 List of rock formations in the United States

References

External links
 Weather forecast: Chaistla Butte
 Aerial video: Gettyimages.com
 Chaistla Butte pronunciation

Colorado Plateau
Landforms of Navajo County, Arizona
Geography of the Navajo Nation
Oligocene volcanism
Diatremes of Arizona
Volcanic plugs of Arizona
Geography of Navajo County, Arizona
Rock formations of Arizona
North American 1000 m summits